The Ankeng light rail (code K) is a light rail transit (LRT) line in Xindian District, New Taipei City, Taiwan. The route begins in Shuangcheng, terminating at Shisizhang where it links with the Circular line. The line is known in the New Taipei Metro system as the Khaki line, or line K. It opened on 10 February 2023 and began service the following day. The rolling stock for the line is produced in Taiwan.

The trams on the Ankeng light rail are a partial battery-powered tram service, most likely the same type of trams used for the Danhai light rail. Construction started around April 2016 on the road level part between Shuangcheng and Jinwen University of Science and Technology stations, with the first tracks laid in November 2018. A depot is located just past Shuangcheng station, near Antai Road. A large part of the depot appears to be inside a mountain, with three large tunnels going through the mountain and a train yard on the other side of the mountain. The train yard construction site is visible on Google Maps. As of September 2022, the line was 93.54% complete. As of December 2021, the elevated section was still under construction, although the Anxin bridge over the Xindian river was 98.13% completed. As of February 2022, the first trams had arrived and entered testing on the track.

On February 10, 2023, the Ankeng LRT officially started operations and passengers could ride for free during the first month.

Stations

Fares
Fares start at NT$20, and are modeled on the Danhai Light Rail's fares. Fees are charged according to the distance of the route. NT$20 for less than 5 kilometers, NT$25 for 5 to 8 kilometers, and NT$25 for one trip at most. The Frequent Passenger Program is also applicable, and you can enjoy a NT$50 discount for every NT$200 spent onboarding.

See also
 Rail transport in Taiwan
 List of railway stations in Taiwan
 Danhai light rail
 Sanying line

References

2023 in rail transport
Buildings and structures under construction in Taiwan
Railway lines in Taiwan
Tram and light rail transit systems under construction
Light rail in Taiwan
New Taipei Metro